Cegłów may refer to:

Cegłów, Grodzisk Mazowiecki County
Cegłów, Mińsk County